12238 Actor  is a Jupiter trojan from the Greek camp, approximately  in diameter. It was discovered on 17 December 1987, by astronomers Eric Elst and Guido Pizarro at the La Silla Observatory in northern Chile. The dark Jovian asteroid has a rotation period of 7.3 hours. It was named after Actor, father of the heroes Eurytus and Cteatus from Greek mythology.

Orbit and classification 

As all Jupiter trojans, Actor is in a 1:1 orbital resonance with Jupiter. It is located in the leading Greek camp at the Gas Giant's  Lagrangian point, 60° ahead on its orbit . It is also a non-family asteroid of the Jovian background population. It orbits the Sun at a distance of 4.5–5.8 AU once every 11 years and 9 months (4,300 days; semi-major axis of 5.17 AU). Its orbit has an eccentricity of 0.12 and an inclination of 21° with respect to the ecliptic.

Naming 

This minor planet was named from Greek mythology after Actor (son of Phorbas and Hyrmine), the alleged father of the twin brothers Eurytus and Cteatus, who beat Nestor, king of Pylos, in a chariot race. The official naming citation was published by the Minor Planet Center on 6 January 2003.

Physical characteristics 

Actor is an assumed C-type asteroid, while the majority of larger Jupiter trojans are D-types.

Rotation period 

In 2007, a rotational lightcurve of Actor was obtained from photometric observations at the Sierra Nevada Observatory, using its 1.5-meter telescope. Lightcurve analysis gave a rotation period of 7.284 hours with a brightness variation of 0.30 magnitude. The same group also published a period determination of  hours with an amplitude of 0.33 magnitude in 2010.

In July and August 2015, observations by the Kepler space telescope during its K2 mission gave another two lightcurves with a concurring period of 7.28 and 7.281 hours, respectively. Both measurements had a brightness variation of 0.29 magnitude.

Diameter and albedo 

According to the survey carried out by the NEOWISE mission of NASA's Wide-field Infrared Survey Explorer, Actor measures 30.25 kilometers in diameter and its surface has an albedo of 0.092, while the Collaborative Asteroid Lightcurve Link assumes a standard albedo for a carbonaceous asteroid of 0.057 and calculates a diameter of 36.78 kilometers based on an absolute magnitude of 10.9.

References

External links 
 Asteroid Lightcurve Database (LCDB), query form (info )
 Dictionary of Minor Planet Names, Google books
 Discovery Circumstances: Numbered Minor Planets (10001)-(15000) – Minor Planet Center
 Asteroid 12238 Actor at the Small Bodies Data Ferret
 
 

012238
Discoveries by Eric Walter Elst
Discoveries by Guido Pizarro (astronomer)
Named minor planets
19871217